Myerscough is an English surname, which is most common in Lancashire. The name originates from the hamlet of Myerscough, in the parish of Myerscough and Bilsborrow near Preston. The town with the highest proportions of Myerscoughs is Fleetwood in Lancashire.  The name is virtually unheard of in the Midlands and the south of England. Historically the name had the more phonetic spelling 'Myerscoe'.

Notable people with the surname include:
 Bill Myerscough, British footballer
 Carl Myerscough, British athlete
 Clarence Myerscough, British violinist
 Henry Myerscough, British viola player
 Joseph Myerscough, British footballer
 Melissa Myerscough, American athlete
 Samuel Myerscough, British musician
 Sarah Myerscough, British artist and sculptor
 Sue E. Myerscough, American judge
 Valerie Myerscough (1942–1980), British mathematician and astrophysicist

References